Jacobus Luna (12 December 1941 – 11 March 2022) was an Indonesian politician. A member of the Indonesian Democratic Party of Struggle, he served as regent of Bengkayang from 2000 to 2010. He died on 11 March 2022, at the age of 80.

References

1941 births
2022 deaths
Golkar politicians
Indonesian Democratic Party of Struggle politicians
People from West Kalimantan